Christian Zübert (born 1973, Würzburg) is a German film director and screenwriter.

Career
Zübert started out as a screenwriter for German television. In 2000 he directed and wrote his first feature Lammbock, which was a surprise hit in Germany with over one million admissions. In the same year he wrote the script for Mädchen, Mädchen which was a box office hit.

In 2004, he directed the children's adventure movie  which received many awards and played numerous international festivals. After directing and writing award winning movies and series for television, e.g. the Tatort crime thriller , Zübert returned to the big screen in 2010 with the comedy-drama Dreiviertelmond (Three Quarter Moon), which was nominated for the German Film Award, won the Bavarian Film Award and the Director´s Guild of Germany Metropolis Award and was screened in many international festivals.

His 2013 effort Tour de Force had its premiere on the Grand Piazza of the Locarno International Film Festival and its North American Premiere on the Toronto International Film Festival, where he returned the following year with his German-Greek drama One Breath.

Selected filmography

Director
 Lammbock (2001)
 Echte Männer? (2003, TV film)
 Was nicht passt, wird passend gemacht (2003, TV series, 3 episodes)
  (2005)
 Hardcover (2008)
 KDD – Kriminaldauerdienst (2010, TV series, 3 episodes)
 Tatort:  (2010, TV series episode)
 Three Quarter Moon (2011)
 Tour de Force (2014)
 One Breath (2015)
 Lommbock (2017)
  (2018, TV series, 6 episodes)
 Bad Banks (2020, TV series, 6 episodes)

Screenwriter
 Der Clown (1998–2001, TV series, 15 episodes)
 Mädchen, Mädchen (dir. Dennis Gansel, 2001)
 Lammbock (dir. Christian Zübert, 2001)
 Absolut das Leben (2002–2006, TV series, 10 episodes)
 Echte Männer? (dir. Christian Zübert, 2003, TV film)
  (dir. Christian Zübert, 2005)
  (dir. , 2006, TV film)
 Vollidiot (dir. , 2007) — based on a novel by Tommy Jaud
  (dir. , 2008) — based on The Outsiders of Uskoken Castle by Kurt Held
 Don Quichote – Gib niemals auf! (dir. , 2008, TV film)
 Hardcover (dir. Christian Zübert, 2008)
  (dir. , 2009)
  (dir. Hermine Huntgeburth, 2010, TV film) — based on a novel by Sven Regener
 Three Quarter Moon (dir. Christian Zübert, 2011)
  (dir. , 2013) — based on a novel by 
 One Breath (dir. Christian Zübert, 2015)
 Lommbock (dir. Christian Zübert, 2017)
 The Collini Case (dir. Marco Kreuzpaintner, 2019) — based on a novel by Ferdinand von Schirach

References

External links
 Agency profile of Christian Zübert
 

1973 births
Living people
Film directors from Würzburg
German screenwriters
German male screenwriters
German television writers
Male television writers